Astragalus nutans is a species of milkvetch known by the common name Providence Mountains milkvetch.

Distribution
It is endemic to the Mojave Desert of eastern California, where it was named for the local Providence Mountains in the Mojave National Preserve.

Description
Astragalus nutans is a small annual or perennial herb growing patchlike and low to the ground or erect to a maximum height near 15 centimeters. Its leaves are a few centimeters long and are made up of several narrow oval-shaped leaflets. Stem and leaves are coated thinly in rough hairs.

The inflorescence bears 6 to 10 pinkish purple flowers with pale petal tips. The fruit is an inflated legume pod up to 2.5 centimeters long. It dries to a thin papery texture and contains many seeds in its single chamber.

References

External links
Jepson Manual Treatment - Astragalus nutans
USDA Plants Profile
Astragalus nutans - Photo gallery

nutans
Endemic flora of California
Flora of the California desert regions
Natural history of the Mojave Desert
Mojave National Preserve
Flora without expected TNC conservation status